The 1998 Australian Grand Prix (formally the 1998 Qantas Australian Grand Prix) was a Formula One motor race held at the Albert Park street circuit in inner Melbourne on 8 March 1998 at 14:00 AEDT (UTC+10). It was the 63rd race in the combined history of the Australian Grand Prix that dates back to the 100 Miles Road Race of 1928. It was the first of the sixteen races of the 1998 FIA Formula One World Championship and held over 58 laps of the 5.3 kilometre street circuit and the sixth to be held on the Albert Park venue first used in 1953, or the third since the new circuit first hosted the race in 1996.

The race was dominated by the McLaren-Mercedes team and won by Mika Häkkinen over his teammate David Coulthard in controversial circumstances. Williams driver Heinz-Harald Frentzen finished third, more than one lap behind. The race also represented the first win for Japanese tyre manufacturer Bridgestone in Formula One and the first race since the 1991 Canadian Grand Prix not won by Goodyear. Johnny Herbert scored his only point of the season.

Race summary

The McLarens of Mika Häkkinen and David Coulthard made good starts from the front row of the grid, but Ferrari's Michael Schumacher, starting third, also had a good start and tried to overtake second place Coulthard. The Ferrari driver stayed with the McLarens, but retired on lap 6 when his engine failed. This handed third place to the Williams of Jacques Villeneuve, who was being chased by Benetton's Giancarlo Fisichella.

After the first round of pitstops, Villeneuve found himself behind teammate Heinz-Harald Frentzen, Ferrari's Eddie Irvine and Fisichella. Fisichella was able to pass Frentzen for third but then retired with mechanical failure, leaving Frentzen to finish just ahead of Eddie Irvine's Ferrari which had gambled on a one-stop strategy. Villeneuve was lapped soon after this by the McLarens, but he still managed to finish in fifth place.

On lap 36 Häkkinen came into the pits unexpectedly, apparently having misheard a call over the radio. He drove straight through the pitlane and rejoined the race without stopping, but lost first place to teammate Coulthard. In 2007, McLaren boss Ron Dennis claimed that someone had tapped into the team's radio system:

We do not and have not manipulated Grands Prix, unless there were some exceptional circumstances, which occurred in Australia [1998], when someone had tapped into our radio and instructed Mika Häkkinen to enter the pits.

A few laps before the end of the race, Coulthard let Häkkinen past on the front straight. The two had made a pre-race agreement that between the two of them, the driver who led at the first corner would go on to win the race, should he be in the position to do so. David Coulthard and the McLaren team were criticised heavily. The situation surrounding Coulthard allowing Häkkinen through would eventually go to the World Motorsport Council. The verdict was that "any future act prejudicial to the interests of competition should be severely punished in accordance with article 151c of International Sporting Code." "Team orders" continued to be controversial in Formula One and were banned following the events of the 2002 Austrian Grand Prix, but were reallowed following the 2010 German Grand Prix. Frentzen took third place for Williams. The race was the first win for the tyre manufacturer Bridgestone after they entered Formula One a year earlier.

After the race concluded, the Australian Grand Prix Corporation chairman, Ron Walker, lodged an official complaint to the FIA into how the actions of the McLaren team decided the race for Häkkinen.

Classification

Qualifying

Race

 Pedro Diniz's car caught fire on the way to the grid.

Championship standings after the race

Drivers'   Championship standings

Constructors'   Championship standings

 Note: Only the top five positions are included for both sets of standings.

References

Grand Prix
Australian Grand Prix
Australian Grand Prix
Australian Grand Prix
Formula One controversies